The  and  is a former DC electric multiple unit (EMU) commuter train types operated by Sagami Railway (Sotetsu) in Kanagawa Prefecture, Japan. They were designed to operate as eight-car or ten-car sets.

7000 series

History 
Built from 1975 by Hitachi in Yamaguchi Prefecture. A total of 80 cars were built, and withdrawn by 2019.
Four cars were converted in 2006 and numbered 701–704, and used as measurement train as well as shunter.

Body 
They had lightweight aluminum bodies, like the 5000 series and 2100 series EMUs.

Initially, 7700 (Tc), 7500 (Tc) and 7100 (M) cars were built. From 1983, 7000 (Mc) and 7600(T) cars were added to form 10-car and 8-car sets.

New 7000 series

History 
From 1986, the front-end design of the 7000 series was changed. Some EMUs in this series use variable-frequency drive motors.

Operations
A total of 60 cars were built and initially operated only as ten-car sets, but some fleets were shortened to 8-car from 2006. All fleets have been replaced with 20000 series by 2020.

Refurbishment

The 7000 series and New 7000 series have been refurbished, since 2008, with the following changes.
 Revised livery (New 7000 series only)
 New electric horn
 Air conditioners changed to new type using environmentally friendly freon
 Single-arm pantographs in place of original lozenge pantographs
 Improved interior fluorescent lighting.

Safety systems
The company plans to build a new line linking to East Japan Railway Company (JR East), and so Sotetsu began to change the original safety system to the standard JR type.

Formations

Key

7000 series

10-car sets

8-car sets

New 7000 series

VFD control set

External links

 Sagami Railway - Railcar image gallery 

Electric multiple units of Japan
7000 series
Train-related introductions in 1975
1500 V DC multiple units of Japan
Hitachi multiple units